On 4 May 1945, at 18:30 British Double Summer Time, at Lüneburg Heath, south of Hamburg, Field Marshal Sir Bernard Law Montgomery accepted the unconditional surrender of the German forces in the Netherlands, northwest Germany including all islands, in Denmark and all naval ships in those areas. The surrender preceded the end of World War II in Europe and was signed in a carpeted tent at Montgomery's headquarters on the Timeloberg hill at Wendisch Evern.

The surrender negotiations and signing ceremony

 

Lüneburg had been captured by the British forces on 18 April 1945 with Montgomery establishing his headquarters at a villa in the village of Häcklingen. A German delegation arrived at his tactical headquarters on the Timeloberg hill by car on 3 May, having been sent by Großadmiral Karl Dönitz who had been nominated President and Supreme Commander of the German armed forces by Adolf Hitler in his last will and testament on 29 April. Dönitz was aware of the allied occupation zones intended for Germany from a plan that had fallen into German hands. He therefore hoped that protracted partial and local surrender negotiations might buy time for troops and refugees in the east to seek refuge from the Red Army, whilst holding open a pocket to provide sanctuary on the west bank of the River Elbe.

Dönitz did not think it appropriate to negotiate personally with a field marshal as he had become the head of state following the death of Adolf Hitler. He therefore sent the delegation headed by the new Commander-in-Chief of the German navy Admiral Hans-Georg von Friedeburg. Montgomery refused an initial offer to surrender Army Group Vistula which was being cut off to the east by the Red Army and demanded the unconditional surrender of all forces on his northern and western flanks. The Germans stated that they did not have the authority to accept Montgomery's terms. However they agreed to return to their headquarters to obtain permission from Dönitz.

The German officers returned the next day at 18:00 with an additional delegate, (Colonel Fritz Poleck) representing the Oberkommando der Wehrmacht (the German armed forces high command). Von Friedeburg was ushered into Montgomery's command caravan for confirmation that they were ready to sign. For the surrender ceremony Montgomery sat at the head of a table with an army blanket draped over it and two BBC microphones in front of him; he called on each delegate in turn to sign the instrument of surrender document at 18.30. The surrender ceremony was filmed by the British Pathé News and recorded for broadcast on radio by the BBC with a commentary by the Australian war correspondent Chester Wilmot. The intimate detail of document translation and conversation interpretation was supervised by one of Montgomery's senior intelligence officers Colonel James Oliver Ewart.

In a report reprinted in The New York Times, CBS war correspondent Bill Downs described the surrender negotiations:

The Instrument of Surrender

Signatories
 United Kingdom:
 Field Marshal Bernard Montgomery – as commander of the 21st Army Group
 Germany:
 Admiral Hans-Georg von Friedeburg – as German Commander-in-Chief of the Navy (Kriegsmarine).
 General Eberhard Kinzel – as chief of staff of the northwest German army (Heer).
 Rear Admiral Gerhard Wagner – as head of the operational department of the Kriegsmarine staff.
 Colonel Fritz Poleck – Oberkommando der Wehrmacht representative (Wehrmacht).
 Major Hans Jochen Freidel – staff officer to General Kinzel (Heer).

Aftermath
Admiral von Friedeburg went on to sign the German Instrument of Surrender preparatory to the ending of World War II in Europe on 7 May at Reims in France and signed again on 8 May with the Supreme High Command of the Red Army, French and US representatives in Berlin. Both Admiral von Friedeburg and General Kinzel committed suicide in the weeks following the surrender; von Friedeburg on 23 May 1945, and Kinzel on 25 June 1945. After the war a monument was erected by the British on what they now called Victory Hill. The monument was dismantled in 1958 and rebuilt at the Royal Military Academy Sandhurst. Today the spot lies in an out-of-bounds military area and is not accessible to the public. In 1995 another monument was erected on the edge of the Timeloberg, outside the restricted area. The last survivor of the negotiations was one of Montgomery's interpreters Derek Knee who died aged 91 in 2014.

See also 
 Debellatio
 End of World War II in Europe
 German Instrument of Surrender

References

1945 in Germany
Aftermath of World War II in Germany
Lüneburg Heath
May 1945 events in Europe
Surrenders